Kerpo Gabriel de León (born 25 February 1974) is a Uruguayan retired  footballer who played as goalkeeper mostly in different clubs in the Liga Nacional de Honduras.

References

1974 births
Living people
People from San Carlos, Uruguay
Uruguayan footballers
Association football goalkeepers
Liga Nacional de Fútbol Profesional de Honduras players
Hispano players
C.D.S. Vida players
Platense F.C. players
F.C. Motagua players
Danubio F.C. players
Uruguayan expatriate footballers
Expatriate footballers in Honduras